Seastrand is a surname. Notable people with the surname include:

 Eric Seastrand (1938–1990), American politician who died in office
 Andrea Seastrand (born 1941), his widow, who succeeded him in office

See also
 Eric Seastrand Highway, a section of California State Route 46